This list of occupational health and safety awards is an index to articles about notable awards for occupational health and safety. The list is organized by country since awards are almost always restricted to organizations in the same country as the sponsor of the award.

Awards by country

United Kingdom / Ireland

United States

See also

 Lists of awards
 List of business and industry awards
 NIOSH
 OSHA
 Occupational safety and health

References

External links 
Safe-In-Sound Award website

Lists of awards